Mtibwa Sugar Football Club is a Tanzanian football club based in Turiani in northern Mvomero District. Their home games are played at Manungu Stadium.and using stadiums such as CCM jamhuri and Gairo as their home stadium

History
Mtibwa Sugar Sports Club was founded in 1988 by a group of workers of Mtibwa Sugar Estates Ltd. who decided to form a football team which will take part in league competitions at district level. The team started playing in the 4th division in 1989 and got promoted to the first division in 1996. In 1998, the league was restructured and became the Premier League.

Achievements
Tanzanian Premier League: 2
1999, 2000.

Tanzania FA Cup: 1
2018.

Performance in CAF competitions
CAF Confederation Cup: 1 appearance
2004 – First Round

CAF Cup: 3 appearances
2000 – Second Round
2001 – First Round
2002 – Second Round

Current squad

External links
 Club website

 
Association football clubs established in 1988
1988 establishments in Tanzania
Works association football clubs in Tanzania